Louis Somers (28 May 1909 – 7 February 1965) was a Belgian footballer. He played in four matches for the Belgium national football team from 1928 to 1930.

References

External links
 

1909 births
1965 deaths
Belgian footballers
Belgium international footballers
Place of birth missing
Association footballers not categorized by position